Barnaba Mersoni (died 1481) was a Roman Catholic prelate who served as Bishop of Terni (1475–1481) and Bishop of Pesaro (1471–1475).

Biography
On 28 March 1471, Barnaba Mersoni was appointed during the papacy of Pope Paul II as Bishop of Pesaro.
On 29 May 1475, he was appointed during the papacy of Pope Sixtus IV as Bishop of Terni.
He served as Bishop of Terni until his death in 1481.

References

External links and additional sources
 (for Chronology of Bishops) 
 (for Chronology of Bishops) 
 (for Chronology of Bishops) 
 (for Chronology of Bishops) 

15th-century Italian Roman Catholic bishops
Bishops appointed by Pope Paul II
Bishops appointed by Pope Sixtus IV
1481 deaths